Somashekar Shiraguppi (born 14 June 1974) is an Indian former first-class cricketer who played for Karnataka and Goa. He worked as a coach after his playing career.

Career
Shiraguppi was a wicket-keeper who batted right-handed. He became Karnataka's first-choice wicket-keeper in the late-1990s and was part of the team's Ranji Trophy victory thrice (in 1995–96, 1997–98 and 1998–99) and Irani Cup victory twice (in 1995–96 and 1997–98). He played his last first-class match for Karnataka in February 2000, and appeared in a few matches for Goa in late 2003. He announced his retirement from first-class cricket in 2006. He finished his career with 41 first-class and 22 List A appearances, having scored over 1000 runs and effected 100-plus dismissals.

After his playing career, Shiraguppi coached cricketers. A NCA qualified Level C coach, He was the assistant coach of Karnataka senior team and coach of under-13 and under-17 teams. He has also worked as wicket-keeping coach of the Board of Control for Cricket in India Specialist Academy.

He co-authored the book "The Elite Batter", a batting guide for young cricketers, with Rajesh Kamath which was released in 2017.

References

External links 
 
 

1974 births
Living people
Indian cricketers
Karnataka cricketers
Goa cricketers
South Zone cricketers
Indian cricket coaches
People from Dharwad
Cricketers from Karnataka